Metylophorus is a genus of common barklice in the family Psocidae. There are at least 50 described species in Metylophorus.

Species
These 50 species belong to the genus Metylophorus:

 Metylophorus barretti (Banks, 1900)
 Metylophorus bicornutus Li & Yang, 1987
 Metylophorus bishopi New, 1972
 Metylophorus brevantenninus Li & Yang, 1987
 Metylophorus cabanae (Williner, 1944)
 Metylophorus calcaratus Mockford, 1991
 Metylophorus camptodontus Li & Yang, 1992
 Metylophorus contaminatus Li & Yang, 1987
 Metylophorus ctenatus New, 1972
 Metylophorus cuneatus (Navas, 1932)
 Metylophorus cyclotus Li, 2002
 Metylophorus daedaleus Li, 2002
 Metylophorus denticulatus (Enderlein, 1910)
 Metylophorus diplodurus Li, 1992
 Metylophorus dongbeicus Li, 2002
 Metylophorus elongatus Endang, Thornton & New, 2002
 Metylophorus fasciatus New, 1980
 Metylophorus fuscatus New, 1978
 Metylophorus giganteus Li, 2002
 Metylophorus hemiphaeopterus (Enderlein, 1900)
 Metylophorus hengshanicus Li, 2002
 Metylophorus hispidus Mockford, 1991
 Metylophorus javensis Endang, Thornton & New, 2002
 Metylophorus jinciensis Li, 2002
 Metylophorus latespinosus Endang, Thornton & New, 2002
 Metylophorus lisae Thornton, 1984
 Metylophorus longicaudatus Li, 2002
 Metylophorus lushanensis Li, 2002
 Metylophorus maculosus Mockford, 1996
 Metylophorus marmoreus Li & Yang, 1988
 Metylophorus medicornutus Li, 2002
 Metylophorus megistus Li, 1997
 Metylophorus mendax Badonnel, 1955
 Metylophorus nebulifer (Navas, 1932)
 Metylophorus nebulosus (Stephens, 1836)
 Metylophorus novaescotiae (Walker, 1853)
 Metylophorus paranebulosus New, 1978
 Metylophorus plebius Li, 1989
 Metylophorus pleiotomus Li, 2002
 Metylophorus purus (Walsh, 1862)
 Metylophorus rotundatus Li, 1992
 Metylophorus symmetricus Mockford, 1991
 Metylophorus theresopolitanus (Enderlein, 1910)
 Metylophorus tricornis Li, 1993
 Metylophorus trivalvis Li, 1992
 Metylophorus uncorneus Li, 2002
 Metylophorus wui Li, 1995
 Metylophorus wuyinicus Li & Yang, 1987
 Metylophorus xizangensis Li & Yang, 1987
 Metylophorus yanezi Badonnel, 1986

References

External links

 

Psocidae
Articles created by Qbugbot